McKinney Run is a  long tributary to Brokenstraw Creek that is classed as a 1st order stream on the EPA waters geoviewer site.

Course
McKinney Run rises in Warren County, Pennsylvania about 2 miles northwest of Irvine and flows south to meet Brokenstraw Creek at Irvine.

Watershed
McKinney Run drains  of the Pennsylvania High Plateau. The watershed receives an average of 44.5 in/year of precipitation and has a wetness index of 335.39.  The watershed is about 87% forested.

See also 
 List of rivers of Pennsylvania

References

Rivers of Pennsylvania
Tributaries of the Allegheny River
Rivers of Warren County, Pennsylvania